This is a chronological summary of the major events of the 2018 Winter Olympics in Pyeongchang County, South Korea. Two events, the curling mixed doubles tournament and the men's normal hill ski jumping competition, held their preliminary rounds on 8 February. The opening ceremony took place one day later on 9 February. The last day of competition and the closing ceremony was on 25 February.

The games featured 102 events in 15 sports, making it the first Winter Olympics to surpass 100 medal events. Four new disciplines in existing sports were introduced to the Winter Olympic programme in Pyeongchang, including big air snowboarding, mixed doubles curling, mass start speed skating, and mixed team alpine skiing.

A Unified Korea women's ice hockey team competed under a separate IOC country code designation (COR); in all other sports, there was a separate North Korea team and a separate South Korea team. As a result of the suspension of the Russian Olympic Committee due to the Russian doping scandal, Russian athletes competed as "Olympic Athletes from Russia" (OAR) under a neutral flag and with the Olympic anthem playing in any ceremony.

All dates and times are KST (UTC+9)

Calendar

Medal table

Day (−1) — Thursday 8 February
 Curling
 This was the first day of matches in the round robin stage of the mixed doubles tournament.

 Ski jumping
 The qualification round of the men's normal hill individual was held, with Andreas Wellinger of Germany taking the top spot with a total score of 133.5. By participating, Japan's Noriaki Kasai became the first athlete in history to participate in eight different Winter Olympics.

Day 0 — Friday 9 February

 Curling
 This was the second day of matches in the round robin stage of the mixed doubles tournament.

 Figure skating
 The men's short and the pairs short in the team event were held, with the day finishing with Canada in the lead with 17 points.

 Freestyle skiing
 The qualifying rounds of both the men's moguls and the women's moguls took place, with Canada's Mikaël Kingsbury and France's Perrine Laffont taking the top spots, respectively.

 Opening ceremony
 The opening ceremony at Pyeongchang Olympic Stadium began at 20:00 KST. Yuna Kim, figure skater gold medalist in 2010 and silver medalist in 2014, lit the Olympic cauldron.

Day 1 — Saturday 10 February

Detailed results (day 1)

 Biathlon
 In the women's sprint, Germany's Laura Dahlmeier recorded a time of 21:06.2 with no penalties to win the gold, Norway's Marte Olsbu had 21:30.4 to win the silver, and Veronika Vítková of the Czech Republic finished in 21:32.0 to win the bronze.

 Cross-country skiing
 In the women's skiathlon, Sweden's Charlotte Kalla won the gold with a time of 40:44.9, Marit Bjørgen of Norway was 7.8 seconds back to win the silver, and Krista Pärmäkoski of Finland won the bronze at 10.1 back.

 Curling
 This was the third day of matches in the round robin stage of the mixed doubles tournament.

 Ice hockey
 This was the first day of matches in the group stage of the women's tournament.

 Luge
 The first two runs in the men's singles were held, with Germany's Felix Loch leading at the end of the day with a total time of 1:35.299.

 Short track speed skating
 South Korea's Lim Hyo-jun set an Olympic record time of 2:10.485 in the final race of the men's 1500m to win the gold. Sjinkie Knegt of the Netherlands had a time of 2:10.555 to win the silver, and Semion Elistratov of Russia had a time of 2:10.687 to win the bronze.
 In the qualifying heats of the women's 500m, Elise Christie of Great Britain set an Olympic record time of 42.872, only to be beaten in a later heat by South Korea's Choi Min-jeong by 0.002 seconds.
 In the qualifying heats of the women's 3000m relay were held, the South Korean team set an Olympic record time of 4:06.387, which was then beaten by China with a time of 4:05.315.

 Ski jumping
 In the final of the men's normal hill individual, Andreas Wellinger of Germany won the gold finishing with a total score of 259.1. Johann André Forfang of Norway finished second with 250.9 points and Robert Johansson finished third with 249.7 points.

 Snowboarding
 The qualification round of the men's slopestyle were held, with Norway's Marcus Kleveland and Canada's Maxence Parrot winning the two heats with times of 83.71 and 87.36, respectively.

 Speed skating
 The Netherlands had a podium sweep, winning all three medals in the women's 3000m: Carlijn Achtereekte finished first with a time of 3:59.21, Ireen Wüst was second at 0.08 back, and Antoinette de Jong was third at 0.81 back.

Summary table (day 1)

Day 2 — Sunday 11 February

Detailed results (day 2)

 Alpine skiing
 The men's downhill was originally scheduled to take place, but was postponed until Thursday 15 February due to high winds.

 Biathlon
 In the men's sprint, Germany's Arnd Peiffer recorded a time of 23:38.8 with no penalties to win the gold, Michal Krčmář of the Czech Republic had 23:43.2 to win the silver, and Dominik Windisch of Italy finished at 23:46.5 to win the bronze.

 Cross-country skiing
 In the men's skiathlon, Norway completed a podium sweep, with Simen Hegstad Krüger (1:16:20.0), Martin Johnsrud Sundby (1:16:28.0) and Hans Christer Holund (1:16:29.9) winning the gold, silver and bronze respectively.

 Curling
 The mixed doubles tournament:
 The fourth and final day of the round robin stage.
 Tie-breaker match:  7–9 

 Figure skating
 The ice dancing short, the ladies' short, and the pairs free program in the team event were held. The day finished with Canada leading with 45 points. Russian Evgenia Medvedeva set a new best score of 81.06 in the ladies' short program.

 Freestyle skiing
 In final medal round of the women's moguls, France's Perrine Laffont won the gold with a score of 78.65, Canada's Justine Dufour-Lapointe won the silver with a score of 78.56, and Yuliya Galysheva of Kazakhstan won the bronze with a score of 77.40.

 Ice hockey
 This was the second day of matches in the group stage of the women's tournament.

 Luge
 In the men's singles, Austria's David Gleirscher had a total time of 3:10.702 to win the gold, Chris Mazdzer of the United States was 0.026 back to finish in second, and Germany's Johannes Ludwig was 0.230 back to win the bronze.

 Snowboarding
 In the men's slopestyle, Redmond Gerard of the United States won the gold (87.16), Canada's Maxence Parrot won the silver (86.00), and Canada's Mark McMorris won the bronze (85.20).
 The qualification round of the women's slopestyle was cancelled due to high winds. All competitors will compete in a two-run final round instead of the typical two-run qualification round and three-run final round.

 Speed skating
 In the men's 5000m, Sven Kramer of the Netherlands set an Olympic record time of 6:09.76 to win the gold. Canada's Ted-Jan Bloemen finished at 6:11.616 to win the silver and Norway's Sverre Lunde Pedersen finished at 6:11.618 to win the bronze.

Summary table (day 2)

Day 3 — Monday 12 February

Detailed results (day 3)

 Alpine skiing
 The women's giant slalom was originally scheduled to take place, but was postponed until Thursday 15 February due to high winds.

 Biathlon
 The men's pursuit was won by Martin Fourcade of France in a time of 32:51.7 with one penalty round, while silver went to Sebastian Samuelsson of Sweden with a time of 33:03.7 and one penalty round, and bronze went to Benedikt Doll of Germany with a time of 33:06.8 and one penalty round.
 The women's pursuit was won by Laura Dahlmeier of Germany, the winner of the sprint event, in a time of 30:35.3 with one penalty round, while silver went to Anastasiya Kuzmina of Slovakia with a time of 31:04.7 and four penalty rounds, and bronze went to Anaïs Bescond of France with a time of 31:04.9 and one penalty round.

 Curling
 The mixed doubles tournament semi-finals:
  8–4 
  7–5 

 Figure skating
 The final day of the team event was held, featuring the men's free program, the ladies' free program, and the ice dancing free program. Canada won the gold with 73 points, the Olympic Athletes from Russia won the silver with 66 points, and the United States won the bronze with 62 points.

 Freestyle skiing
 The final rounds of the men's moguls. Mikaël Kingsbury of Canada scored 86.63 to win the gold, Matt Graham of Australia won the silver with a score of 82.57, and Japan's Daichi Hara won the bronze with an 82.19 score.

 Ice hockey
 The third day of matches in the group stage of the women's tournament.

 Luge
 The first two runs in the women's singles were held, with Germany's Natalie Geisenberger leading at the end of the day with a total time of 1:32.454.

 Ski jumping
 The women's normal hill individual was won by Norway's Maren Lundby with 264.6 points, while silver went to Katharina Althaus of Germany with 252.6 points, and bronze went to Japan's Sara Takanashi with 243.8 points.

 Snowboarding
 Under the women's slopestyle two-run final round that was held due to the high winds on the previous day, Jamie Anderson of the United States recorded a score of 83.00 to win the gold, Laurie Blouin of Canada won the silver with a 76.33 score, and Finland's Enni Rukajärvi had a 75.38 to finish with the bronze.
 The qualification round of the women's halfpipe was held, with Chloe Kim (United States) recording the best score of 95.50.

 Speed skating
 The women's 1500 m was won by Ireen Wüst of the Netherlands in a time of 1:54.35. Silver went to Japan's Miho Takagi in a time of 1:54.55, while bronze went to Marrit Leenstra of the Netherlands in a time of 1:55.26.

Summary table (day 3)

Day 4 — Tuesday 13 February

Detailed results (day 4)

 Alpine skiing
 The men's combined was won by Austria's Marcel Hirscher in a time of 2:06.52. Silver and bronze went to Alexis Pinturault and Victor Muffat-Jeandet of France with times of 2:06.75 and 2:07.54, respectively.

 Cross-country skiing
 The men's individual sprint was won by Norway's Johannes Høsflot Klæbo in a time of 3:05.75, followed by Italy's Federico Pellegrino with a time of 3:07.09 and Aleksandr Bolshunov of the Olympic Athletes from Russia with a time of 3:07.11.
 The women's individual sprint was won by Sweden's Stina Nilsson in a time of 3:03.84, followed by Norway's Maiken Caspersen Falla with a time of 3:06.87 and Yulia Belorukova of the Olympic Athletes from Russia with a time of 3:07.21.

 Curling
 The mixed doubles tournament:
 Bronze medal game:  8–4 
 The Russian team would later be stripped of their bronze medals on 22 February, after Aleksandr Krushelnitskiy failed a doping test. The medals were then awarded to the Norwegian team instead.
 Gold medal game:  10–3 

 Ice hockey
 The fourth day of matches in the group stage of the women's tournament.

 Luge
 The final runs in the women's singles were won by Germany's Natalie Geisenberger in a time of 3:05.232, ahead of fellow German Dajana Eitberger with a time of 3:05.599 and Alex Gough of Canada with a time of 3:05.644.

 Short track speed skating
 The final heats of the women's 500 m were won by Arianna Fontana of Italy in a time of 42.569. Silver went to Yara van Kerkhof of the Netherlands with a time of 43.256, while bronze went to Canada's Kim Boutin with a time of 43.881.
 The qualifying heats of the men's 1000 m were held. Canada's Charles Hamelin set a new Olympic record time of 1:23.407.
 The qualifying heats of the men's 5000 m relay took place. The South Korean team qualified for the final in the fastest time, setting an Olympic record of 6:34.510.

 Snowboarding
 The finals of the women's halfpipe were won by Chloe Kim of the United States with a score of 98.25. Silver went to China's Liu Jiayu with a score of 89.75, while bronze went to Arielle Gold of the United States with a score of 85.75.
 The qualification round of the men's halfpipe.

 Speed skating
 The men's 1500 m was won by Kjeld Nuis of the Netherlands in a time of 1:44.01, followed by his compatriot Patrick Roest with a time of 1:44.86 and South Korea's Kim Min-seok with a time of 1:44.93.

Summary table (day 4)

Day 5 — Wednesday 14 February

Detailed results (day 5)

 Alpine skiing
 The women's slalom was originally scheduled to take place, but was postponed to Friday 16 February due to high winds.

 Biathlon
 The women's individual was originally scheduled to take place, but was postponed to Thursday 15 February due to high winds.

 Curling
 The first day of matches in the round robin stage of the men's tournament.
 The first day of matches in the round robin stage of the women's tournament.

 Figure skating
 The pairs skating short program took place, with the Chinese pair of Wenjing Sui and Cong Han leading at this stage with a score of 82.89.

 Ice hockey
 The first day of matches in the group stage of the men's tournament.
 The fourth day of matches in the group stage of the women's tournament.

 Luge
 The doubles were won by Tobias Wendl and Tobias Arlt of Germany in a time of 1:31.697, followed by Peter Penz and Georg Fischler of Austria with a time of 1:31.785, and Toni Eggert and Sascha Benecken of Germany with a time of 1:31.987.

 Nordic combined
 The individual normal hill/10 km was won by Germany's Eric Frenzel in a time of 24:51.4, ahead of Japan's Akito Watabe with a time of 24:56.2 and Austria's Lukas Klapfer with a time of 25:09.5.

 Snowboarding
 The finals of the men's halfpipe was won by Shaun White of the United States with a score of 97.75. Silver went to Japan's Ayumu Hirano with a score of 95.25, while bronze went to Australia's Scott James with a score of 92.00.

 Speed skating
 The women's 1000 m was won by Jorien ter Mors of the Netherlands in an Olympic record time of 1:13.56. Silver went to Japan's Nao Kodaira with a time of 1:13.82, while bronze went to her compatriot Miho Takagi with a time of 1:13.98.

Summary table (day 5)

Day 6 — Thursday 15 February

Detailed results (day 6)

 Alpine skiing
 Because of high winds on Sunday 11 February, the men's downhill was moved to this day. The race was won by Norway's Aksel Lund Svindal in a time of 1:40.25, followed by his compatriot Kjetil Jansrud with a time of 1:40.37, and Beat Feuz of Switzerland with a time of 1:40.43.
 The men's super-G, originally scheduled on this day, was postponed to Friday 16 February to make room for the men's downhill competition.
 Because of high winds on Monday 12 February, the women's giant slalom was moved to this day. The race was won by Mikaela Shiffrin of the United States in a time of 2:20.02, followed by Norway's Ragnhild Mowinckel with a time of 2:20.41, and Italy's Federica Brignone with a time of 2:20.48.

 Biathlon
 The men's individual was won by Johannes Thingnes Bø of Norway in a time of 48:03.8 with two penalties, followed by Slovenia's Jakov Fak with a time of 48:09.3 and no penalties, and Austria's Dominik Landertinger with a time of 48:18.0 and no penalties.
 The women's individual was moved to this day due to high winds on the original day (Wednesday 14 February). Gold went to Hanna Öberg of Sweden with a time of 41:07.2 and no penalties. Silver went to Slovakia's Anastasiya Kuzmina with a time of 41:31.9 and two penalties, while bronze went to Germany's Laura Dahlmeier with a time of 41:48.4 and one penalty.

 Cross-country skiing
 The women's 10 km freestyle was won by Ragnhild Haga of Norway in a time of 25:00.5. Silver went to Sweden's Charlotte Kalla with a time of 25:20.8, while bronze was shared by Norway's Marit Bjørgen and Finland's Krista Pärmäkoski with an identical time of 25:32.4.

 Curling
 The second day of matches in the round robin stage of the men's tournament.
 The second day of matches in the round robin stage of the women's tournament.

 Figure skating
 The pairs skating free program was won by Aljona Savchenko and Bruno Massot of Germany with a score of 235.90. Silver went to Sui Wenjing and Han Cong of China with a score of 235.47, while bronze went to Meagan Duhamel and Eric Radford of Canada with a score of 230.15.

 Freestyle skiing
 The qualifying rounds of the women's aerials took place. The best qualifying score came from Alla Tsuper of Belarus, with a score of 99.37.

 Ice hockey
 The second day of matches in the group stage of the men's tournament.
 The fifth day of matches in the group stage of the women's tournament.

 Luge
 The team relay was won by the German team in a time of 2:24.517, followed by the Canadian team with a time of 2:24.872 and the Austrian team with a time of 2:24.988.

 Skeleton
 The first two runs of the men's skeleton took place, with Yun Sung-bin (South Korea) leading at this stage with a total time of 1:40.35.

 Snowboarding
 The men's snowboard cross final was won by Pierre Vaultier of France, ahead of Australia's Jarryd Hughes and Spain's Regino Hernández.

 Speed skating
 The men's 10,000 m was won by Ted-Jan Bloemen of Canada with an Olympic record time of 12:39.77. Silver went to Jorrit Bergsma of the Netherlands with a time of 12:41.98, while bronze went to Italy's Nicola Tumolero with a time of 12:54.32.

Summary table (day 6)

Day 7 — Friday 16 February

Detailed results (day 7)

 Alpine skiing
 The men's super-G was moved to this day due to the rescheduling of the men's downhill competition. It was won by Matthias Mayer of Austria in a time of 1:24.44. Silver went to Switzerland's Beat Feuz with a time of 1:24.57, while bronze went to Norway's Kjetil Jansrud with a time of 1:24.62.
 The women's slalom was moved to this day due to high winds on the original day (Wednesday 14 February). It was won by Frida Hansdotter of Sweden in a time of 1:38.63, ahead of Switzerland's Wendy Holdener with a time of 1:38.68 and Austria's Katharina Gallhuber with a time of 1:38.95.

 Cross-country skiing
 The men's 15 km freestyle was won by Dario Cologna of Switzerland in a time of 33:43.9, followed by Norway's Simen Hegstad Krüger with a time of 34:02.2 and Denis Spitsov of the Olympic Athletes from Russia with a time of 34:06.9.

 Curling
 The third day of matches in the round robin stage of the men's tournament.
 The third day of matches in the round robin stage of the women's tournament.

 Figure skating
 The men's singles short program.

 Freestyle skiing
 The finals of the women's aerials were won by Hanna Huskova of Belarus with a score of 96.14. Silver went to China's Zhang Xin with a score of 95.52, while bronze went to her compatriot Kong Fanyu with a score of 70.14.

 Ice hockey
 The third day of matches in the group stage of the men's tournament.

 Skeleton
 The final two runs of the men's skeleton. The event was won by Yun Sung-bin of South Korea in a time of 3:20.55, followed by Nikita Tregubov of the Olympic Athletes from Russia with a time of 3:22.18 and Dominic Parsons of Great Britain with a time of 3:22.20.
 The first two runs of the women's skeleton.

 Ski jumping
 The qualification round of the men's large hill individual.

 Snowboarding
 The women's snowboard cross was won by Michela Moioli of Italy. Silver went to France's Julia Pereira de Sousa Mabileau, while bronze went to Eva Samková of the Czech Republic.

 Speed skating
 The women's 5000 m was won by Esmee Visser of the Netherlands in a time of 6:50.23, ahead of Martina Sáblíková of the Czech Republic with a time of 6:51.85 and Natalya Voronina of the Olympic Athletes from Russia with a time of 6:53.98.

Summary table (day 7)

Day 8 — Saturday 17 February

Detailed results (day 8)

 Alpine skiing
 The women's super-G was won by Ester Ledecká of the Czech Republic in a time of 1:21.11, ahead of Austria's Anna Veith with a time of 1:21.12 and Liechtenstein's Tina Weirather with a time of 1:21.22.

 Biathlon
 The women's mass start was won by Anastasiya Kuzmina of Slovakia with a time of 35:23.0. Darya Domracheva of Belarus was 18.8 back to win silver and Tiril Eckhoff of Norway was 27.7 back to win the bronze.

 Cross-country skiing
 The women's 4 × 5 km relay was won by the Norwegian team in a time of 51:24.3, ahead of Sweden with a time of 51:26.3 and the Olympic Athletes from Russia with a time of 52:07.6.

 Curling
 The fourth day of matches in the round robin stage of the men's tournament.
 The fourth day of matches in the round robin stage of the women's tournament.

 Figure skating
 The men's singles free program. The competition was won by Yuzuru Hanyu of Japan with a score of 317.85. Silver went to his compatriot Shoma Uno with a score of 306.90, while bronze went to Spain's Javier Fernández with a score of 305.24.

 Freestyle skiing
 The women's slopestyle was won by Sarah Höfflin of Switzerland with a score of 91.20. Silver went to her compatriot Mathilde Gremaud with a score of 88.00, while bronze went to Great Britain's Isabel Atkin with a score of 84.60.
 The qualifying rounds of the men's aerials took place, with the Olympic Athlete from Russia Ilia Burov recording the best qualifying score of 126.55.

 Ice hockey
 The women's tournament quarter-finals:
  Olympic Athletes from Russia 6–2 
  7–2 
 The fourth day of matches in the group stage of the men's tournament.

 Short track speed skating
 Canada's Samuel Girard won the final of the men's 1000 m with a time of 1:24.650 to the gold. John-Henry Krueger of the United States finished second with 1:24.864, and South Korea's Seo Yi-ra finished third at 1:31.619.
 The final of the women's 1500 m was won by South Korea's Choi Min-jeong with a time of 2:24.948. China's Li Jinyu finished second at 2:25.703 and Canada's Kim Boutin finished third at 2:25.834.

 Skeleton
 Lizzy Yarnold of Great Britain won the gold in the women's skeleton with a total time of 3:27.28. Germany's Jacqueline Lölling was second with a total time of 3:27.73, and Great Britain's Laura Deas was third with 3:27.90.

 Ski jumping
 The final round of the men's large hill individual was won by Kamil Stoch of Poland with a total score of 285.7. Germany's Andreas Wellinger won the silver with a score of 282.3 and Robert Johansson of Norway had a total of 275.3 to win the bronze.

Summary table (day 8)

Day 9 — Sunday 18 February

Detailed results (day 9)

 Alpine skiing
 The men's giant slalom was won by Marcel Hirscher of Austria in a time of 2:18.04. Silver went to Norway's Henrik Kristoffersen with a time of 2:19.31, while bronze went to France's Alexis Pinturault with a time of 2:19.35.

 Biathlon
 The men's mass start was won by Martin Fourcade of France in a photo finish ahead of Germany's Simon Schempp, both with a time of 35:47.3. Bronze went to Norway's Emil Hegle Svendsen with a time of 35:58.5.

 Bobsleigh
 The first two runs of the two-man took place, with Germany's Nico Walther and Christian Poser leading at this stage with a total time of 1:38.39.

 Cross-country skiing
 The men's 4 × 10 km relay was won by the Norwegian team in a time of 1:33:04.9, ahead of the Olympic Athletes from Russia with a time of 1:33:14.3 and France with a time of 1:33:41.8.

 Curling
 The fifth day of matches in the round robin stage of the men's tournament.
 The fifth day of matches in the round robin stage of the women's tournament.

 Freestyle skiing
 The men's slopestyle was won by Øystein Bråten of Norway with a score of 95.00. Silver went to Nick Goepper of the United States with a score of 93.60. The bronze medal went to Alex Beaulieu-Marchand of Canada with a score of 92.40.
 The finals of the men's aerials were won by Oleksandr Abramenko of Ukraine with a score of 128.51. Silver went to China's Jia Zongyang with a score of 128.05, while bronze went to Ilya Burov of the Olympic Athletes from Russia with a score of 122.17.

 Ice hockey
 The women's tournament 5–8th place semi-finals:
  2–0 
  1–2 
 The fifth day of matches in the group stage of the men's tournament.

 Speed skating
 The qualification heats of the men's team pursuit took place, with the South Korean team recording the best time of 3:38.29.
 The women's 500 m was won by Nao Kodaira of Japan in an Olympic record time of 36.94. Silver went to South Korea's Lee Sang-hwa with a time of 37.33, while bronze went to the Czech Republic's Karolína Erbanová with a time of 37.34.

Summary table (day 9)

Day 10 — Monday 19 February

Detailed results (day 10)

 Bobsleigh
 The final two runs of the two-man. The gold medal was shared by Justin Kripps and Alexander Kopacz of Canada and Francesco Friedrich and Thorsten Margis of Germany with an identical time of 3:16.86. Bronze went to Oskars Melbārdis and Jānis Strenga of Latvia with a time of 3:16.91.

 Curling
 The sixth day of matches in the round robin stage of the men's tournament.
 The sixth day of matches in the round robin stage of the women's tournament.

 Figure skating
 The ice dancing short program took place, with the Canadian pair of Tessa Virtue and Scott Moir leading at this stage with a score of 83.67.

 Freestyle skiing
 The qualifying rounds of the women's halfpipe took place. Canadian Cassie Sharpe qualified with the best score of 93.40.

 Ice hockey
 The women's tournament semi-finals:
  5–0 
  5–0  Olympic Athletes from Russia

 Ski jumping
 The men's large hill team was won by the Norwegian team with a score of 1098.5. Silver went to the German team with a score of 1075.7, while bronze went to the Polish team with a score of 1072.4.

 Snowboarding
 The qualification round of the women's big air took place, with Austrian Anna Gasser qualifying with the best score of 98.00.

 Speed skating
 The qualification heats of the women's team pursuit took place. The Netherlands qualified with the fastest time, setting a new Olympic record of 2:55.61.
 The men's 500 m was won by Håvard Holmefjord Lorentzen of Norway in an Olympic record time of 34.41, ahead of South Korea's Cha Min-kyu with a time of 34.42 and China's Gao Tingyu with a time of 34.65.

Summary table (day 10)

Day 11 — Tuesday 20 February

Detailed results (day 11)

 Biathlon
 The mixed relay was won by the French team in a time of 1:08:34.3, ahead of the Norwegian team with a time of 1:08:55.2 and the Italian team with a time of 1:09:01.2.

 Bobsleigh
 The first two runs of the two-woman.

 Curling
 The seventh day of matches in the round robin stage of the men's tournament.
 The seventh day of matches in the round robin stage of the women's tournament.

 Figure skating
 The ice dancing free program was held. The competition was won by Tessa Virtue and Scott Moir of Canada, who set a world record total score of 206.07. Gabriella Papadakis and Guillaume Cizeron of France won silver with 205.28. Maia Shibutani and Alex Shibutani of the United States were third with 192.59.

 Freestyle skiing
 In the final of the women's halfpipe, Canada's Cassie Sharpe won the gold with a score of 95.80, France's Marie Martinod scored a 92.60 to win the silver, and Brita Sigourney of the United States finished third with 91.60.
 The qualifying rounds of the men's halfpipe were held. Aaron Blunck (United States) qualified with the best score of 94.40.

 Ice hockey
 The women's tournament:
 Seventh place game:  6–1 
 Fifth place game:  1–0 
 The men's tournament qualification playoffs:
  5–1 
  1–2  
  5–2 
  1–2  

 Nordic combined
 In the individual large hill/10 km, Germany achieved a podium sweep, with gold going to Johannes Rydzek with a time of 23:52.5, silver going to Fabian Rießle with a time of 23:52.9, and bronze going to Eric Frenzel with a time of 23:53.3.

 Short track speed skating
 The final heats of the women's 3000 m relay were won by the South Korean team in a time of 4:07.361, ahead of the Italian team (4:15.901). After the Chinese and Canadian teams were disqualified in the A final, the bronze medal was awarded to the Dutch team, who finished the B final (originally to determine fifth place) in a world record time of 4:03.471.
 The qualifying heats of the women's 1000 m took place. The fastest time in any heat, 1:29.519, was recorded by Dutch skater Suzanne Schulting.
 The qualifying heats of the men's 500 m took place. Dajing Wu (China) set a new Olympic record time of 40.264.

Summary table (day 11)

Day 12 — Wednesday 21 February

Detailed results (day 12)

 Alpine skiing
 The women's downhill was won by Italy's Sofia Goggia in a time of 1:39.22, followed by Norway's Ragnhild Mowinckel with a time of 1:39.31, and Lindsey Vonn of the United States with a time of 1:39.69.

 Bobsleigh
 The final two runs of the two-woman were won by Mariama Jamanka and Lisa Buckwitz of Germany in a time of 3:22.45. Silver went to Elana Meyers Taylor and Lauren Gibbs of the United States with a time of 3:22.52, while bronze went to Canada's Kaillie Humphries and Phylicia George with a time of 3:22.89.

 Cross-country skiing
 The men's team sprint was won by the Norwegian team in a time of 15:56.26, ahead of the team composed of Olympic Athletes from Russia with a time of 15:57.97 and the French team with a time of 15:58.28.
 The women's team sprint was won by the United States team in a time of 15:56.47, ahead of the Swedish team with a time of 15:56.66 and the Norwegian team with a time of 15:59.44.

 Curling
 The eighth day of matches in the round robin stage of the men's tournament.
 The eighth day of matches in the round robin stage of the women's tournament.

 Figure skating
 The ladies' singles short program took place, with Alina Zagitova (an Olympic Athlete from Russia) recording the best score of 82.92.

 Freestyle skiing
 The men's ski cross was won by Brady Leman of Canada, followed by Switzerland's Marc Bischofberger and the Olympic Athlete from Russia Sergey Ridzik.

 Ice hockey
 The women's tournament bronze medal game:
  3–2  Olympic Athletes from Russia
 The men's tournament quarter-finals:
  3–2  
  Olympic Athletes from Russia 6–1 
  1–0 
  3–4  

 Snowboarding
 The qualification round of the men's big air took place. Carlos Garcia Knight (New Zealand) qualified with the best score of 97.50.

 Speed skating
 The final heats of the men's team pursuit was won by the Norwegian team in a time of 3:37.32, ahead of the South Korean team with a time of 3:38.52. Bronze went to the Netherlands, who won the bronze race in a time of 3:38.40, ahead of New Zealand's 3:43.54.
 The final heats of the women's team pursuit was won by the Japanese team in an Olympic record time of 2:53.89, ahead of the Dutch team with a time of 2:55.48. Bronze went to the United States, who won the bronze race in a time of 2:59.27, ahead of Canada's 2:59.72.

Summary table (day 12)

Day 13 — Thursday 22 February

Detailed results (day 13)

 Alpine skiing
 The men's slalom was won by Sweden's André Myhrer with a total time of 1:38.99. Switzerland's Ramon Zenhäusern won the silver with a total time of 1:39.33, and Austria's Michael Matt was third with a total time of 1:39.66.
 Because of expected high winds on Friday 23 February, the women's combined was moved to this day. Michelle Gisin of Switzerland won the gold with a time of 2:20.90, Mikaela Shiffrin of the United States won silver with a time of 2:21.87, and Wendy Holdener of Switzerland was third with 2:22.34.

 Biathlon
 The women's relay was won by Belarus with a time of 1:12:03.4. Sweden finished in second with 1:12:14.1 and France was third with 1:12:21.0.

 Curling
 It was announced that as a result of Russian curlier Alexander Krushelnitskiy failing a doping test for meldonium, he and his partner Anastasia Bryzgalova were stripped of their bronze medals for the mixed doubles tournament. The medals were then awarded to Kristin Skaslien and Magnus Nedregotten of Norway, who had lost to the Russian team in the bronze medal game.
 The men's tournament:
 Tie-breaker match:  5–9 
 Semi-finals:
  9–3 
  3–5 

 Freestyle skiing
 In the final of the men's halfpipe, David Wise of the United States won the gold with a score of 97.20, Alex Ferreira of the United States was second with 96.40, and Nico Porteous of New Zealand had a 94.80 to finish with the bronze.

 Ice hockey
 The women's tournament gold medal game:
  2–3  

 Nordic combined
 The team large hill/4 × 5 km was won by the German team in a time of 46:09.8, ahead of the Norwegian team with a time of 47:02.5 and the Austrian team with a time of 47:17.6.

 Short track speed skating
 In the final of the women's 1000 m, Suzanne Schulting of the Netherlands won gold with a time of 1:29.778, Canada's Kim Boutin finished at 1:29.956 to win silver, and Italy's Arianna Fontana finished third at 1:30.656.
 China's Wu Dajing set a world record in the final of the men's 500 m with a time of 39.584. Korea's Hwang Dae-heon and Lim Hyo-jun finished second and third with times of 39.854 and 39.919, respectively.
 In the final of the men's 5000 m relay, the Hungarian team set an Olympic record time of 6:31.971 to win the gold. China finished second (6:32.035) and Canada finished third (6:32.282).

 Snowboarding
 The qualification round of the men's parallel giant slalom was originally scheduled for this day, but was postponed to Saturday 24 February due to high winds.
 The qualification round of the women's parallel giant slalom was originally scheduled for this day, but was postponed to Saturday 24 February due to high winds.
 Because of expected high winds on Friday 23 February, the final round of the women's big air was moved to this day. Anna Gasser of Austria won the gold with a score of 185.00, Jamie Anderson of the United States won the silver with 177.25, and Zoi Sadowski-Synnott of New Zealand was third with 157.50.

Summary table (day 13)

Day 14 — Friday 23 February

Detailed results (day 14)

 Alpine skiing
 The women's combined was originally scheduled to take place, but was moved back to Thursday 22 February due to high winds being expected.

 Biathlon
 The men's relay was won by the Swedish team in a time of 1:15:16.5, ahead of the Norwegian team with a time of 1:16:12.0 and the German team with a time of 1:17:23.6.

 Curling
 The men's tournament bronze medal game.
  5–7 
 The women's tournament semi-finals.
  8–7 
  10–5 

 Figure skating
 The ladies' singles free program was held. The competition was won by Russian Alina Zagitova with a total score of 239.57, Russian Evgenia Medvedeva won silver with 238.26, and Canadian Kaetlyn Osmond was third with 231.02.

 Freestyle skiing
 The qualification round of the women's ski cross was originally scheduled for this day, but was moved back to Thursday 22 February due to high winds.
 The women's ski cross was won by Kelsey Serwa of Canada, followed by Canada's Brittany Phelan and Switzerland's Fanny Smith.

 Ice hockey
 The men's tournament semi-finals:
  0–3  Olympic Athletes from Russia
  3–4 

 Snowboarding
 The final round of the women's big air was originally scheduled to take place, but was moved back to Thursday 22 February due to high winds being expected.

 Speed skating
 The men's 1000 m was won by Kjeld Nuis of the Netherlands in a time of 1:07.95. Silver went to Norway's Håvard Holmefjord Lorentzen with a time of 1:07.99, while bronze went to South Korea's Kim Tae-yun with a time of 1:08.22.

Summary table (day 14)

Day 15 — Saturday 24 February

Detailed results (day 15)

 Alpine skiing
 In the mixed team, the Swiss team defeated Austria, 3–1, in the gold medal final. The bronze medal final between Norway and France ended in a 2–2 tie, with Norway being awarded the bronze based on total time (41.17 to 41.29).

 Bobsleigh
 The first two runs of the four-man.

 Cross-country skiing
 The men's 50 km classical was won by Finland's Iivo Niskanen in a time of 2:08:22.1, ahead of Aleksandr Bolshunov and Andrey Larkov of the Olympic Athletes from Russia with times of 2:08:40.8 and 2:10:59.6, respectively.

 Curling
 The men's tournament gold medal game.
  7–10 
 The women's tournament bronze medal game.
  3–5 

 Ice hockey
 The men's tournament bronze medal game.
  4–6 

 Snowboarding
 In the final round of the men's big air, Canada's Sebastien Toutant won gold with a total score of 174.25. Kyle Mack of the United States was second with 168.75 and Great Britain's Billy Morgan won bronze with 168.00.
 The men's parallel giant slalom: The qualification rounds, originally scheduled for Thursday 22 February, was moved to this day to precede the final rounds of this event. In the gold medal race, Nevin Galmarini of Switzerland beat Lee Sang-ho of South Korea by 0.43 seconds. In the bronze medal race, Slovenia's Žan Košir beat France's Sylvain Dufour by 1.49 seconds.
 The women's parallel giant slalom: The qualification round, originally scheduled for Thursday 22 February, was moved to this day to precede the final rounds of this event. Ester Ledecká of the Czech Republic beat Selina Jörg of Germany in the gold medal race by 0.46 seconds. In the bronze medal race, Germany's Ramona Theresia Hofmeister beat Russia's Alena Zavarzina by 4.07 seconds.
 Ledecká, who also won gold in the Alpine skiing women's super-G, became the first woman to win gold in two different sports during the same Winter Olympics.

 Speed skating
 The men's mass start was won by Lee Seung-hoon of South Korea with 60 points, ahead of Belgium's Bart Swings with 40 points and Koen Verweij of the Netherlands with 20 points.
 The women's mass start was won by Japan's Nana Takagi with 60 points, ahead of South Korea's Kim Bo-reum with 40 points and Irene Schouten of the Netherlands with 20 points.

Summary table (day 15)

Day 16 — Sunday 25 February

Detailed results (day 16)

 Bobsleigh
 The final two runs of the four-man were held. The competition was won by the German team of Francesco Friedrich, Candy Bauer, Martin Grothkopp, and Thorsten Margis with a total time of 3:15.85. The silver was shared by another German team (Nico Walther, Kevin Kuske, Alexander Rödiger, and Eric Franke) and a South Korean team (Won Yun-jong, Jun Jung-lin, Seo Young-woo, and Kim Dong-hyun) with identical total time of 3:16.38.

 Cross-country skiing
 Norway's Marit Bjørgen won the women's 30 km classical with a time of 1:22:17.6. Finland's Krista Pärmäkoski finished second at 1:24:07.1 and Sweden's Stina Nilsson finished third at 1:24:16.5.

 Curling
 The women's tournament gold medal game:
  3–8 

 Figure skating
 The exhibition gala, featuring performances by the individual gold medalists and many others.

 Ice hockey
 The men's tournament gold medal game.
  Olympic Athletes from Russia 4–3  

 Closing ceremony
 The closing ceremony took place at Pyeongchang Olympic Stadium at 20:00 KST. It included the traditional handover to Beijing, the host city of the next Winter Olympics in 2022.

Summary table (day 16)

Notes

References

External links 
 Pyeongchang 2018 Official website

2018 Winter Olympics
2018